Trà Vinh City is the capital city of Trà Vinh province in southern Vietnam.

Location 
It is located in the Mekong Delta region, which is in the Southern part of Vietnam. Under the Republic of Vietnam, it was the provincial capital of a province with a population of 51,535.

Government Resolution No. 11/NQ-CP 04/03/2010 established the city of Trà Vinh with an area of 6803.5 hectares and a population of 131,360 inhabitants and 10 administrative units.

On February 15, 2016, Trà Vinh City was classified as a level II city in Vietnam's cities classification system.

Trà Vinh had 1,286,000 inhabitants in 2019.

Administrative divisions 
The area directly under the town consists of:
 9 urban wards: numbered from 1 to 9
 1 rural communes: Long Đức

References

External links 
  Official website

Populated places in Trà Vinh province
Districts of Trà Vinh province
Provincial capitals in Vietnam
Cities in Vietnam